David Moreno (born July 14, 1985 in Logroño, La Rioja) is a Spanish singer, actor, presenter, and journalist.

Education
From 1993 to 2009, Moreno took singing and dancing classes with many different Spanish teachers.  He took a high school musical workshop with Stage Entertainment Spain (Madrid) in 2008.  From 2006 to 2007, he attended Espada de Madera Theatre School in Madrid, and from 2007 to 2009 attended Corazza Actors Studio in Madrid.  In 2009, he received a degree in journalism from The Complutense University of Madrid, and a degree in acting and musical theatre from Arts Educational Schools, London.

After signing with the record label 'Blanco y Negro' he reached the top 9 at the Spanish charts with his single 'Turn Up The Radio'. Recently he launched 'Sueña Conmigo' and 'Titanio' a great version of David Guetta's hit.

Recently, he's been working at TV shows as Todo Es Mentira and Sálvame, and he also hosted the gameshow La Casa de los Retos, aired on Boing.

Television
La Casa de los Retos. Boing. Host. 2020–present
Coke Studio. [Coca-Cola Music Experience] Coke. Host. 2020–present
La habitación del Pánico Cuatro y Divinity Colaborador
Todo Es Mentira. Cuatro. Reporter. 2019 
MorninGlory. Mediaset. Host and director. 2018
Dulceweekend. [mtmad] Host., 2017, 2018.
La Tele Que Los Parió. [Fórmula TV]. 2012
Metro a Metro. Telemadrid. 2012
In The Qube (Spanish version). Animax. Host. 2010
Planeta Pokémon. Jetix. Host. 2005-2009.
My School Musical 2: Locos por el baile. Disney Channel. Host. 2008
RIS Científica. TeleCinco & Videomedia. Actor. 2007
Corta-T. Cuatro & Videomedia. Actor. 2007
Un Paso Adelante. Antena 3 & Globomedia. Extra. 2003

Theatre
Thriller Jackson. Michael Jackson Tribute. Spanish Tour 2014-2015.
ABBA 40 - Abba Tribute. Spanish Tour 2013-2014.
High School Musical on Stage! as Ryan Evans. Spanish Tour 2008-2009. Stage Entertainment Spain
Grease Tour. Spain. Elite Productions.
Pulgarcito. Teatro Arlequín (Madrid) and On Tour (Valencia). Olimpy Productions
El príncipe feliz. Teatro Arlequín (Madrid) and On Tour (Valencia). Olimpy Production

Voice-Over & Recordings
Kiss Me feat. Julián The Angel. (June 2014)
Block Party - reached the Top2 at the Pop iTunes Charts in Spain. (June 2013)
Turn Up The Radio - His first solo single, reached the Top9 at iTunes Spain. (June 2012)
Irreality Show! it's a radio show that he hosts. HappyFM.es (2011-2012 )
High School Musical OST (Spain) as Ryan, EMI Music Spain & Disney Records
Pokémon: Advanced Battle (Opening Song for the Spanish TV Series)
Pokémon: Battle Frontier (Opening Song for the Spanish TV Series)
Spanish Video Lessons: being a cartoon voice over, UR Universidad de La Rioja (Spain)

Others
June 2012 released his first solo single "Turn Up The Radio" reaching the númber 9 on the Spanish iTunes charts, and number 3 on Spanish dance charts.
Nominated as Best New Actor for HSM at Gran Vía Musical Theatre Awards (Spain)

References (in Spanish)

mediaset.es "Boing estrena 'La Casa de los Retos'" - actualizado octubre de 2020
cineytele.com "Animax estrena su primer programa de producción propia" - actualizado marzo de 2010
Mundoplus.tv "Animax presenta su nuevo espacio semanal: "In The Qube" - actualizado marzo de 2010
La Rioja "El actor riojano David Moreno estrena la obra 'High School Musical'" - actualizado febrero 2008
El Mundo "Arranca 'High School Musical'" - actualizado septiembre 2008
Todo musicales Entrevista "David Moreno y Ana San Martín, los gemelos de HIGH SCHOOL MUSICAL, valoran su paso por el musical" - actualizado enero 2009
La Opinión Coruña "David Moreno: ´Nuestro espectáculo tiene la magia de Disney y Broadway´"
Red Teatral "David Moreno como parte del Cast de High School Musical

External links 
 
 David Moreno on Instagram. Archived from the original on ghostarchive.org
 

David Moreno on YouTube

1989 births
People educated at the Arts Educational Schools
Spanish male stage actors
Spanish television presenters
Spanish male television actors
Living people
People from Logroño
Spanish male voice actors
21st-century Spanish singers
21st-century Spanish male singers